Freaks: You're One of Us is a 2020 German superhero film directed by Felix Binder, written by Marc O. Seng and starring Cornelia Gröschel, Tim Oliver Schultz and Wotan Wilke Möhring. An unofficial superhero-themed homage to the 1932 film Freaks, the film is a cooperation between ZDF's Das Kleines Fernsehspiel and the streaming platform Netflix.

It was released on 2 September 2020.

Plot 
Wendy works in a diner and lives with her husband and son in an unnamed suburb in Germany. When she meets the homeless Marek, her life changes. He advises her to stop taking the pills that her psychiatrist prescribes for her. She takes them because of an event in her childhood where she was inexplicably involved in the death of the school principal. He also says to her "You are one of us," then jumps off a highway bridge and is run over. The next evening she meets Marek again, who is unharmed. This convinces her to stop taking the pills.

After she leaves the diner after her next shift, she is attacked. She discovers her powers and hurls her attackers into the air for several meters. Then she uses her skills and threatens her boss to get a promotion. Her colleague Elmar, who also has powers, sees this.

Together they try to get to the bottom of the origin of their abilities and discover a government conspiracy. The government attempts to lock away people with abilities and drug them to suppress the forces.

Cast 
 Cornelia Gröschel as Wendy Schulze
 Tim Oliver Schultz as Elmar Mund
 Wotan Wilke Möhring as Marek
 Nina Kunzendorf as Dr. Stern
 Frederic Linkemann as Lars Schulze
 Finnlay Berger as Karl Schulze
 Gisa Flake as Angela
 Ralph Herforth as Gerhart
 Thelma Buabeng as Chantal

References

External links
 
 

2020 films
2020s superhero films
Teen superhero drama films
German-language Netflix original films
German superhero films
2020s German films